Maliades or Meliades may refer to three types of nymph in Greek mythology:

 Epimeliads, protectors of apple trees
 Meliae, protectors of ash trees
 Spercheides, naiads of the river Spercheios on Mount Othrys in Malis.